Gurunahalli is a village in Dharwad district of Karnataka, India.

Demographics 
As of the 2011 Census of India there were 412 households in Gurunahalli and a total population of 2,232 consisting of 1,158 males and 1,074 females. There were 318 children ages 0-6.

References

Villages in Dharwad district